= Bramley North =

- Location within Gauteng Location within South Africa
- Coordinates: 26°07′07″S 28°04′35″E
- Country: South Africa
- Province: Gauteng
- Municipality: City of Johannesburg
- Main Place: Sandton

Area
  - Total: 0.30 km^{2} (0.12 sq mi)

Population (2011)
  - Total: 553
  - Density: 1,800/km^{2} (4,800/sq mi)

Racial makeup (2011)
  - Black African: 37.3%
  - Coloured: 5.3%
  - Indian/Asian: 21.4%
  - White: 35.7%
  - Other: 0.4%

First languages (2011)
  - English: 69.4%
  - Zulu: 9.1%
  - Sotho: 4.3%
  - Tswana: 3.3%
  - Other: 13.9%
- Time zone: UTC+2 (SAST)
- Postal code (street): 2090

Bramley North is a suburb of Johannesburg, South Africa. It is located in Region E of the City of Johannesburg Metropolitan Municipality.
